Erkki Lill (born April 24, 1968 in Tallinn) is an Estonian curler and curling coach.

At the national level, he is a six-time Estonian men's champion curler (2005, 2008, 2009, 2010, 2011, 2020), a five-time Estonian mixed champion curler (2009, 2011, 2012, 2013, 2014) and a three-time Estonian mixed doubles champion curler (2013, 2015, 2017).

Out of curling, he competed as marathon runner.

Teams

Men's

Mixed

Mixed doubles

Record as a coach of national teams

References

External links

Erkki Lill - Tulemused - sport24.ee
Erkki Lill - ERR Sport
Erkki Lill - Postimees Sport: Värsked spordiuudised Eestist ja välismaalt
Erkki Lill - Teemalehed - DELFI
CV: Heiki Lill - ETIS

Video: 

Living people
1968 births
Sportspeople from Tallinn
Estonian male curlers
Estonian curling champions
Estonian curling coaches
Estonian male marathon runners